Rupak Tala (rupak taal) or also known as Roopak Taal is a popular tala in Hindustani music that is common in Bhajans and Geets. It has seven matras (beats) in three vibhags (divisions). Unlike the popular Tintal, the vibhags of Rupak Tala are not of equal length. Also, both the khali and sam of Rupak Tala fall on the first matra.

Aavartan

The aavaratan (cycle) of Rupak Tala has three vibhags (divisions).  The first vibhag has three matras and both the second and third vibhags have two matras.  Sam is on the first matra of the first vibhag.  The aavaratan of Rupak Taal may be written as follows:

Examples

There are numerous examples of Rupak Tala that differ based upon the instrument used.  The following examples apply for the tabla.

Theka

The most common theka for Rupak tala contains the bols 'Tin', 'Na', and 'Dhin' (the transliteration of these bols may differ quite a lot among individuals).  This theka is composed in the following manner 

Tin Tin Na X| Dhin Na 2| Dhin Na 3

Prakar

Prakars are fairly open to the individual performer's flair.  That being said, however, the following is an example of three common Rupak Tala prakars.
Tin Tin Na | Dhin NaNa | Dhin NaNa
Tin Tin Na | Dha Dha Tirkit | Dha Dha Tirkit
Tin Tin Nana | Dhirkt NaNa | Dhirkt NaNa
Tin Tin Nana | Dhirkt tktk | Dhirkt tktk

Tihai

A tihai for Rupak Tala must begin on either the third or the sixth matra to end on sam.  The following is an example of a simple tihai for Rupak Tala that begins on matra three.
X X Tr | kt Tr | kt Tr
Da X X | X X | X X

External links
 Courtney, D 2001, Learning the Tabla, Mel Bay Publications - Google Books Link. (p. 28 on Rupak Tala)
 KKSongs Tabla Guide. (Chapter 11 on Rupak tala)
 Rupak Tala on YouTube.

Notes

References

 'Chapter 21: Theka, Prakar, and Laggi', in KKSongs Tabla Guide, <http://kksongs.org/tabla/chapter21.html>, viewed May 10, 2008.
 Lipiczky, T 1985, 'Tihai Formulas and the Fusion of "Composition" and "Improvisation" in North Indian Music', in The Music Quarterly, Vol. 71, No. 2, pp. 157–171.
 Ram Avatar 'Vir' 2002, Learn to Play on tabla - 2 (Advance Course), Pankaj Publications, New Delhi.

Hindustani talas